Lewis Norman Dobbin (born 3 January 2003) is an English professional footballer who plays as a striker for Derby County on loan from Everton.

Club career
Dobbin was born in Stoke-on-Trent and joined Everton at the age of 11. On 25 September 2021, Dobbin made his professional debut for Everton as a substitute for Alex Iwobi in a 2–0 home league win over Norwich City. On 3 August 2022, Dobbin joined League One side Derby County on a season-long loan.
On 9th November 2022, he missed the crucial fifth penalty in a shootout against Everton’s arch-rivals Liverpool in the 3rd round of the Carabao Cup, when his shot was saved by Caoimhín Kelleher. Derby went on to lose the shootout 3-2.

International career
In October 2019 Dobbin scored for the England under-17 team in a draw against Germany and the following month he scored again in a defeat at home to Denmark. In February 2020 Dobbin scored against Russia and then twice against Ukraine.

On 6 October 2021, Dobbin made a his England U19s debut during a 3–1 defeat to France in Marbella.

Personal life 
Dobbin was born in Stoke-on-Trent.

Career statistics

Notes

References

External links 

2003 births
Living people
Footballers from Stoke-on-Trent
English footballers
Everton F.C. players
Derby County F.C. players
Premier League players
English Football League players
Association football forwards
England youth international footballers